Aslan Aslanbekovich Khuriyev (born 28 April 1984) is a former Russian professional football player.

Club career
He played in the Russian Football National League for FC Alania Vladikavkaz in 2008.

External links
 
 

1984 births
Sportspeople from Vladikavkaz
Living people
Russian footballers
Association football forwards
FC Spartak Vladikavkaz players